Northern Ladies F.C. is a Ghanaian professional women's football club based in Tamale in the Northern Region of Ghana. The club features in the Ghana Women’s Premier League. The club was formed as the major women's team in the three northern regions.

Grounds 
The club plays their home matches at the Aliu Mahama Sports Stadium in Tamale.

References

External links 

 Official Website
 Northern Ladies FC on Facebook

 Footy Ghana category about Northern Ladies FC

2005 establishments in Ghana
Association football clubs established in 2005
Women's football clubs in Ghana